Alp is a Turkish masculine name meaning "hero". It has been used as a title, a given name, and a surname. 

In Proto-Turkic, it was a title used for both men and women. In the Khakas Turkic epic "Khuban Arig", this title represents being brave, valiant, and also having shamanic skills. Alps can travel between the worlds (middleworld, underworld, upperworld), talk with animals, and commune with the spirits of nature.

Notable people with the name include:

Given name

 Alp Ikizler, American nephrologist of Turkish origin
 Alp Iluetuer (fl. 680s), vassal ruler of the North Caucasian Huns
 Alp Kırşan (born 1979), Turkish actor
 Alp Khan (died c. 1315), general and governor of Gujarat
 Alp Mehmet (born 1948), British former diplomat
 Alp Ozkilic, (born 1986), Turkish-American mixed martial artist
 Alp Tarkhan (8th century), Khazar general
 Alp Tigin (died 963), Turkic slave commander of the Samanid Empire and governor of Ghazna
 Alp Yalman (born 1940), Turkish businessman

Surname
 Ahmet Vefik Alp (1948–2021), Turkish architect and urbanist
 Çetin Alp (1947–2004), Turkish pop music singer
 Chris Alp (fl. 1980), Australian Paralympic athlete
 Hüseyin Alp (1935–1983), Turkish basketball player and actor
 Kaya Alp (died 1214), Baig of the Kayı tribe
 Kelvyn Alp (born 1971), New Zealand politician and activist
 Nejat Alp (born 1952), Turkish musician who plays synth-driven Turkish ambient folk
 Orhan Alp (1919–2010), Turkish mechanical engineer, politician and government minister
 Sedat Alp (1913–2006), first archaeologist in Turkey with a specialization in Hittitology
 Turgut Alp, one of the early Gazis of the Ottoman Empire

As a title 

 Alp Er Tunga

See also
 ALP (disambiguation)
 Alper
 Alparslan (disambiguation)

References

Turkish masculine given names